Agnostic Front is an American hardcore punk band from New York City. Founded in 1980, the band is considered an important influence on the New York hardcore scene, as well as a pioneer of the crossover thrash genre.

History

First era (1980–1992)
Formed in 1980 with Vincent "Vinnie Stigma" Capuccio (formerly of the Eliminators) on lead guitar, with Diego on bass, Rob Krekus (aka Robby Crypt Crash) on drums and John Watson on vocals. Despite being billed at their first concert as the Zoo Crew, Stigma introduced them as Agnostic Front, saying that the poster had been made prior to deciding on the name. They soon added Ray Barbieri, aka Raybeez, on drums and Adam Mucci on bass. After Watson was arrested, the band hired James Kontra as their vocalist, who eventually quit before a performance at Great Gildersleeves after a disagreement with Capuccio about how to hand out stickers. Although never having spoken to him before, Stigma told some of his friends to ask Roger Miret (former bass player of the Psychos) if he wanted to be the vocalist of Agnostic Front, because he liked his style of slam dancing. In 1983, this lineup recorded their debut EP United Blood. The EP was officially released later that year, however by that point Mucci had departed from the band, and been replaced by Todd Youth.

During its initial phase, the band consisted entirely of skinheads. Although this would change over time, Agnostic Front would continue to feature skinheads as part of their line-up. This led to a belief among some that the band espoused ultra-nationalist or fascist politics, an assertion denied by vocalist Roger Miret in a 1985 Flipside interview:

"...We're skinheads. And the skinheads in England have a very bad name like with the fascists and stuff like that. But this is America not England. Just because the skinheads are fascists over there doesn't mean we got to grow our hair out if we don't feel like it.... We love our country — but not necessarily how our government works."

The follow-up, Victim in Pain (1984), is regarded as a seminal New York hardcore release. Dave Jones replaced Raybeez on drums after a mutual agreement among the band members that Raybeez "needed time" to address a developing drug problem. Additionally, Rob Kabula took over on bass. In 1984, Jimmy "The Kid" Colletti from Justified Violence joined on drums when the band went to tour with The Exploited later that year. The album pushed the band to the forefront of New York's fledgling hardcore scene, which was centered around CBGB, where they played with bands like Cro-Mags and Murphy's Law. Roger Miret asserts that all the songs on the album "are totally inspired by the streets of New York and my life and what was going on with my friends. It was dangerous. We did what we had to do to survive by any means necessary. It was like a war or a battlefield, and we stood our ground".

1986's Cause for Alarm was a difficult album to record, due to constant line-up changes and personnel problems. Released on Combat Records, it added thrash metal influences. With other bands such as Suicidal Tendencies and Stormtroopers of Death, this album would mark AF's foray into the world of crossover thrash. It also featured some lyrics written by Peter Steele and drumming by Louie Beateaux (both of Carnivore).

With yet another new line-up, the band soon released Liberty and Justice For... in 1987. The album featured stripped down punk with a lack of thrash influences, yet it contained many metal-style guitar solos. It did not sell nearly as well as previous releases. Sometime later, Miret was arrested on drug charges after releasing a live album, and spent his time in prison writing new songs while Stigma and the band toured Europe for the first time. The lyrics written by Miret while incarcerated formed most of 1992's One Voice, which featured members of Madball and Sick of It All. Not long after its release, the band decided to call it quits. Their last show was at CBGB on December 20, 1992, Last Warning, which was also released with United Blood EP on the end of the release.

Second era (1996–present)

Stigma and Miret reformed Agnostic Front in May 1996 and did a few reunion shows in December 1996, signing to Epitaph Records and recruiting Jimmy Colletti on drums and Rob Kabula on bass, who was playing with Against the Grain at the time. Their latest venture was titled Something's Gotta Give. In 1999, they followed up with Riot, Riot, Upstart. They also won an MTV Award for the title track music video. Their comeback albums have sold well and been mostly acclaimed by music critics for their pure hardcore punk sound.

In 2001, they released the album Dead Yuppies. Songs from this album were rarely played live, as the band considered it more a product of Loved and Hated, Jimmy Colletti's side-project band.

In 2002, Miret worked on a side-project band, Roger Miret and the Disasters, looking for a sound akin to old school punk rock and Oi!. Also that year, the band appeared in Matthew Barney's film Cremaster 3 along with Murphy's Law.

Agnostic Front came out in 2004 with Another Voice. The album was regarded mainly as a follow-up to One Voice. The album, however, did receive some criticism from fans and the press for apparently changing their music to fit the current wave of 'tough guy' bands. Musically, the album bears resemblance to bands that were heavily influenced by Agnostic Front, such as Hatebreed. Miret's vocals on the album particularly seemed to turn off many less hardcore punk-oriented fans. Later, the track "Peace" was contributed to the mash-up album Threat: Music That Inspired the Movie, where it was remixed by Schizoid and renamed "World at War".

On March 7, 2006, Agnostic Front released the DVD Live at CBGB. This follows the efforts of many bands that tried to save CBGB from shutting down. Miret claims that "We played more shows at CBGB than any band ever, and we played more benefit shows for CBGB than any band ever" when the club did close, most nostalgia focused on 1970s punk bands.

On November 6, 2007, Agnostic Front released the album Warriors with the hit "For My Family" which was largely a continuation of the band's crossover thrash sound.

For the 25th anniversary of their debut LP Victim in Pain, Bridge Nine Records released remastered versions of said album along with their first EP, United Blood, on November 17, 2009.

The band performed on the Persistence Tour in Europe in the winter of 2009 and have were confirmed for Rebellion Festival 2012 in Blackpool, England.

In 2015, the band released the album The American Dream Died via Nuclear Blast Records which consisted mostly of the bands older style of music with a modern touch. The band continued to tour extensively in Europe as well as the U.S. in support of the record.

In 2017, Stigma and Miret appeared in a documentary about Agnostic Front, The Godfathers of Hardcore, directed by Ian McFarland.

In 2022, it was revealed on the band's Facebook that Pokey Mo had parted ways with Agnostic Front in 2020 and that Danny Lamagna would be their new drummer.

Members
Current
 Vinnie Stigma – lead guitar, backing vocals (1980–present)
 Roger Miret – lead vocals (1982–present)
 Mike Gallo – bass, backing vocals (2000–present)
 Craig Silverman – rhythm guitar, backing vocals (2014–present)
 Danny Lamagna – drums (2020–present)

Former

 Rob Krekus – drums (1980–1981)
 John Watson – lead vocals (1980–1982)
 James Kontra – lead vocals (1982)
 Diego – bass (1980–1982)
 Raymond "Raybeez" Barbieri – drums (1981–1983, died 1997)
 Adam Mucci – bass (1982–1983)
 Dave Jones – drums (1983–1985)
 Rob Kabula – bass (1983–1987, 1997–2000)
 Todd Youth – bass (1983, died 2018)
 Alex Kinon – rhythm guitar (1985–1986)
 Gordon Ancis – rhythm guitar (1986–1987)
 Joe "Fish" Montanaro – drums (1986–1987)
 Louie Beato – drums (1986)
 Alan Peters – bass (1987, died 2020)
 Steve Martin – rhythm guitar (1987–1990)
 Will Shepler – drums (1987–1993)
 Craig Setari – bass (1987–1993)
 Matt Henderson – rhythm guitar, backing vocals (1990–1993)
 Jimmy Colletti – drums (1997–2004)
 Steve Gallo – drums (2004–2009)
 Joseph James – rhythm guitar, backing vocals (2007–2014)
 Pokey Mo – drums (2009–2020)

Timeline

Discography

Studio albums
 Victim in Pain (1984) Rat Cage Records
 Cause for Alarm (1986) Relativity/Combat Records
 Liberty and Justice For... (1987) Relativity/Combat Records
 One Voice (1992) Relativity/Roadrunner Records
 Something's Gotta Give (1998) Epitaph Records
 Riot, Riot, Upstart (1999) Epitaph Records
 Dead Yuppies (2001) Epitaph Records
 Another Voice (2004) Nuclear Blast Records
 Warriors (2007) Nuclear Blast Records
 My Life My Way (2011) Nuclear Blast Records
 The American Dream Died (2015) Nuclear Blast Records
Get Loud! (2019) Nuclear Blast Records

Live albums
 Live at CBGB (1989) Relativity Records
 Last Warning (1993) Relativity/Roadrunner Records
 Working Class Heroes (2002) I Scream Records split with Discipline
 Live at CBGB - 25 Years of Blood, Honor and Truth  (2006) Nuclear Blast Records

Compilation
 To Be Continued: The Best of Agnostic Front (1992) Relativity
 Raw Unleashed (1995) Grand Theft Audio
 Respect Your Roots Worldwide (2012) Strength Records

EPs
 United Blood (1983) Last Warning Records
 Puro des Madre (en español) EP (1998) Hellcat Records
 Unity (1999) split with Dropkick Murphys
 For My Family EP (2007) Nuclear Blast Records
 That's Life 7" (2011) Bridge 9 Records

Music videos
 Growing Concern (1986)
 Anthem [Live] (1989)
 Gotta Go (1998)
 Riot, Riot, Upstart (1999)
 So Pure to Me (2004)
 Peace (2005)
 All Is Not Forgotten (2005)
 All Is Not Forgotten [Live] (2006)
 Addiction (2007)
 For My Family (2007)
 Dead to Me [Live] (2007)
 That's Life (2011)
 A Mi Manera (2011)
 My Life My Way (2011)
 Us Against the World (2012)
 Blitzkrieg Bop (2013)
 Police Violence (2015)
 The American Dream Died (2015)
 A Wise Man (2015)
 Never Walk Alone (2015)
 Old New York (2015)
 Spray Painted Walls (2019)
 I Remember (2019)
 Conquer and Divide (2019)
 Urban Decay (2020)

DVD/VHS
 Live at CBGB 2006
 CBGB: Punk from the Bowery (Compilation)
 LIVE in N.Y.C. '91 (split with Sick of It All & Gorilla Biscuits)

References

Further reading
 Maximum Rocknroll No. 328 (Sept/Oct 2010), interview by Bruce Roehrs

External links

Official website (archived)
Agnostic Front's Victim in Pain at 25 Roger Miret interview by Village Voice December 1, 2009
1984 Interview, Guillotine Fanzine / Ragged Edge Collection @ Archive.org]

1980 establishments in New York City
 
American thrash metal musical groups
Bridge 9 Records artists
Combat Records artists
Crossover thrash groups
Epitaph Records artists
Hardcore punk groups from New York (state)
Musical groups established in 1980
Musical quintets
Nuclear Blast artists